This is a list of Island groups, regions and provinces of the Philippines by their highest point.

Island group

Regions

Provinces

See also 
 List of mountains in the Philippines

References

Geography of the Philippines